Robert Harry Philibosian (born September 29, 1940) is an American politician. He was appointed Los Angeles County District Attorney in 1981 when his predecessor John Van de Kamp was elected Attorney General of California.  Philibosian served as  district attorney until 1984 when he was defeated in countywide election by Ira Reiner. He received his B.A. in history from Stanford University and his law degree from Southwestern Law School, and was admitted to the California State Bar in 1968.  He is now Of counsel at the law firm of Sheppard, Mullin, Richter & Hampton.

Philibosian is best known as the presiding District Attorney during the infamous McMartin preschool trial. One of the other prosecutors, Glenn Stevens, left the case in protest that other prosecutors had withheld evidence from the defense. Stevens accused Robert Philibosian, the deputy district attorney on the case, of lying and withholding evidence from the court and defense lawyers in order to keep the Buckeys in jail and prevent access to exonerating evidence. Philobosian was running a losing race to be re-elected at the time.

References

External links

1940 births
Living people
California Republicans
District attorneys in California
American people of Armenian descent
Southwestern Law School alumni
Stanford University alumni